Aderval Arvani (born 7 January 1949) is a Brazilian volleyball player. He competed in the men's tournament at the 1972 Summer Olympics.

References

External links
 

1949 births
Living people
Brazilian men's volleyball players
Olympic volleyball players of Brazil
Volleyball players at the 1972 Summer Olympics
Sportspeople from São Paulo
Pan American Games medalists in volleyball
Pan American Games bronze medalists for Brazil
Medalists at the 1971 Pan American Games